JRun is a J2EE application server, originally developed in 1997 as a Java Servlet engine by Live Software and subsequently purchased by Allaire, who brought out the first J2EE compliant version. It was acquired by Macromedia prior to its 2001 takeover of Allaire, and subsequently by Adobe Systems when it bought Macromedia in 2005. Its latest patch Updater 7 was released by Adobe in 2007. Updater 7 added Sun JDK 1.6 support, Apache 2.2 support, Windows Vista/IIS7 support and Mac OS X 10.4 on Intel support.

Adobe announced in August 2007 that it would discontinue new feature development for JRun. The ColdFusion team will continue to make changes to its underlying Java engine as required for ColdFusion 9 but have replaced JRun in favor of Apache Tomcat in ColdFusion 10.

External links
 Adobe JRun 4
 Adobe announce end of new feature development
 JRun definition (Whatis.com)

JRun
Web server software

jRun